Oddamavadi Bridge is a road bridge in Oddamavadi, Sri Lanka a length of 250 meters. It crosses the Valaichchenai Lagoon at Batticaloa. The bridge is part of the A15 Batticaloa-Trincomallee highway. It comprises 2 bridges, a British Ceylon era truss bridge which is used as road-rail bridge, and a newly built bridge carrying 2 lanes of highway. The new Oddamavadi bridge was built with financial assistance of the Spanish  Government and the World Bank.

References 

1924 establishments in Ceylon
2010 establishments in Sri Lanka
Bridges completed in 1924
Bridges completed in 2010
Bridges in Batticaloa District